Gastão Elias was the defending champion, but decide not to participate this edition. Agustín Velotti won in the final against Blaž Rola 6-3, 6-4.

Seeds

Draw

Finals

Top half

Bottom half

References
 Main Draw
 Qualifying Draw

Peugeot Tennis Cup - Singles
2013 Singles